Elvis Álvarez (February 2, 1965 - July 16, 1995) was a Colombian professional boxer in the flyweight division.

Boxing career 
Álvarez turned professional in 1985 and captured the vacant WBO flyweight title with a decision win over Miguel Mercedes in 1989, and quickly vacated his title in March 1990 due to lack of interest in belt. In 1991 he captured the WBA flyweight title with a decision win over Leopard Tamakuma, but lost it in his first defense to Yong-Kang Kim. In 1994, in his only American appearance, he lost a twelve-round decision to Junior Jones for the WBA bantamweight title. It was to be his last fight.

Murder 
Álvarez was shot to death on July 16, 1995 in Medellín, Colombia.

References

External links 
 

1965 births
1995 deaths
Colombian murder victims
Male murder victims
Flyweight boxers
Super-flyweight boxers
World Boxing Association champions
World Boxing Organization champions
World flyweight boxing champions
Deaths by firearm in Colombia
People murdered in Colombia
Sportspeople from Medellín
Colombian male boxers
20th-century Colombian people